Neottiura is a genus of comb-footed spiders that was first described by Anton Menge in 1868.

Species
 it contains six species and one subspecies, found in Asia, Europe, North America, and Algeria:
Neottiura bimaculata (Linnaeus, 1767) (type) – North America, Europe, Turkey, Caucasus, Russia (Europe to Far East), Kazakhstan, Iran, Central Asia, China, Japan
Neottiura b. pellucida (Simon, 1873) – Spain, France, Italy
Neottiura curvimana (Simon, 1914) – Portugal, Spain, France, Algeria
Neottiura herbigrada (Simon, 1873) – Madeira, Mediterranean, Ukraine, China, Korea
Neottiura margarita (Yoshida, 1985) – Russia (Far East), China, Korea, Japan
Neottiura suaveolens (Simon, 1880) – Europe
Neottiura uncinata (Lucas, 1846) – Mediterranean

In synonymy:
N. apicata O. Pickard-Cambridge, 1872 = Neottiura uncinata (Lucas, 1846)
N. nivalia (Saito, 1934) = Neottiura bimaculata (Linnaeus, 1767)
N. pusillata (Roewer, 1942) = Neottiura herbigrada (Simon, 1873)
N. pustulifera (Levy & Amitai, 1982) = Neottiura herbigrada (Simon, 1873)
N. regia (Drensky, 1929) = Neottiura suaveolens (Simon, 1880)

See also
 List of Theridiidae species

References

Araneomorphae genera
Spiders of Africa
Spiders of Asia
Theridiidae